Ernest Greathead (21 March 1891 – 20 December 1951) was a South African cricketer. He played in seven first-class matches for Eastern Province in 1925/26 and 1926/27.

See also
 List of Eastern Province representative cricketers

References

External links
 

1891 births
1951 deaths
South African cricketers
Eastern Province cricketers
People from Makhanda, Eastern Cape
Cricketers from the Eastern Cape